Charles Russell Magel (June 3, 1920 – March 22, 2014) was an American philosopher, animal rights activist and bibliographer. He was professor emeritus of Philosophy and Ethics at Moorhead State University.

Early life 
Charles Russell Magel was born on June 3, 1920, in Burlington, Iowa, where he grew up on a 150-acre farm with eight siblings. He studied electrical engineering at Iowa State College, going on to study at Northwestern University for three years.

After graduation, he worked as a night clerk at a hotel and served for five years in the US Naval Reserve during the Second World War. In 1950, inspired by Albert Schweitzer's autobiography Out of My Life and Thought, Magel enrolled in graduate school at the University of Minnesota to study philosophy.

Magel submitted his dissertation, An Analysis of Kierkegaard's Philosophic Categories in 1960. In 1962, he initiated a philosophy program at Moorhead State University.

Career 
After reading Peter Singer's Animal Liberation and Tom Regan's "The Moral Basis of Vegetarianism", in 1975, Magel became a vegetarian and introduced an animal rights course onto the philosophy curriculum, making it one of the first university courses completely focused on the topic. He was considered to be a pioneer of applied ethics.

He was an outspoken opponent of animal testing, once stating: "Ask the experimenters why they experiment on animals, and the answer is: 'Because the animals are like us.' Ask the experimenters why it is morally okay to experiment on animals, and the answer is: 'Because the animals are not like us.' Animal experimentation rests on a logical contradiction."

In the 1980 edition of Henry S. Salt's Animals' Rights Considered in Relation to Social Progress, edited by Peter Singer, Magel updated Salt's original bibliography. In 1981, Magel published A Bibliography on Animal Rights and Related Matters lists over 3,200 works. He retired from teaching in 1985. In 1989, Magel authored Keyguide to Information Sources in Animal Rights a bibliography of works dealing with animal rights. It was positively reviewed as an "outstanding resource that many academic libraries will want to acquire." Another review described it as a "carefully crafted and scholarly overview to the literature and philosophy of the animal rights movement." 

In 1992, Magel published a new edition of J. Howard Moore's The Universal Kinship, including a biographical essay of Moore. In 1997, Magel published a new edition of Lewis Gompertz's Moral Inquiries on the Situation of Man and of Brutes.

Death 
Magel died on March 22, 2014; he left Moorhead State University $800,000 to establish the Charles R. Magel Endowment Fund.

Selected publications

Books

Papers

See also 

 List of animal rights advocates

References

External links
 Interview with Charles Magel discussing early animal rights principles and his transition to vegetarianism (1981)
 Speech given by Charles Magel at the Mobilization for Animals Rally in Madison, Wisconsin (1983)

1920 births
2014 deaths
20th-century American philosophers
American animal rights activists
American animal rights scholars
American bibliographers
American ethicists
Animal ethicists
Anti-vivisectionists
Historians of animal rights
Iowa State University alumni
People from Burlington, Iowa
Place of death missing
Minnesota State University Moorhead alumni
Northwestern University alumni
United States Navy reservists
University of Minnesota alumni